Hewit is a surname.  Notable people with the name include:

Alex Hewit (born 1985), American lacrosse player
Augustine Francis Hewit (1820–1897), American priest
Gordon Hewit (1958–2009), British swimmer
Mabel Hewit (1903–1984), American woodblock print artist
Nathaniel Hewit (1788–1867), American clergyman

See also
Hewitt (name), given name and surname